Altnurga Nature Reserve is a nature reserve which is located in Jõgeva County, Estonia.

The area of the nature reserve is 98 ha.

The protected area was founded in 2015 to protect valuable habitat types and threatened species in Altnurga village (former Puurmani Parish).

References

Nature reserves in Estonia
Geography of Jõgeva County